Brian O'Keeffe (born 1977) is an Irish hurler who played as a right corner-forward for the Cork senior team.

Born in Blackrock, Cork, O'Keeffe first arrived on the inter-county scene at the age of seventeen when he first linked up with the Cork minor team, before later joining the under-21 side. He joined the senior panel during the 2001 championship. O'Keeffe went on to play a bit part for Cork over the next few years.

At club level O'Keeffe is a three-time championship medallist with Blackrock.

Throughout his career Prendergast made just one championship appearance for Cork. He retired form inter-county hurling following the conclusion of the 2002 championship.

Honours

Team

Blackrock
Cork Senior Hurling Championship (3): 1999, 2001, 2002

Cork
All-Ireland Under-21 Hurling Championship (2): 1997 (sub), 1998
Munster Under-21 Hurling Championship (2): 1997, 1998
All-Ireland Minor Hurling Championship (1): 1995 (c)
Munster Minor Hurling Championship (1): 1995 (c)

References

1977 births
Living people
Blackrock National Hurling Club hurlers
Cork inter-county hurlers